Rutiliini is a tribe of flies in the family Tachinidae.

Genera
Amphibolia Macquart, 1844
Chetogaster Macquart, 1851
Chrysopasta Brauer & von Bergenstamm, 1889
Formodexia Crosskey, 1973
Formosia Guerin-Meneville, 1843
Prodiaphania Townsend, 1927
Rutilia Robineau-Desvoidy, 1830
Rutilodexia Townsend, 1915

References

Brachycera tribes
Dexiinae
Diptera of Australasia
Diptera of Asia